Ivan Anokye Mensah (born 22 April 2004) is a Ghanaian professional footballer who plays as defender for Ghanaian Premier League side International Allies F.C.

Club career 
Mensah started his professional career with Ghanaian lower-tier side MŠK Žilina Africa FC, a team which plays in the Ghana Division Two League and are affiliated to Slovak side MŠK Žilina. In March 2021, he joined Ghana Premier League side International Allies for the remainder of the 2020–21 season. He made his debut on 4 April 2021, after playing the full 90 minutes in a 1–1 win over Dreams FC.

International career 
Mensah is a member of the Ghana national under-20 football team. In 2020–21, he was a member of the team that won the 2020 WAFU U-20 Zone B Tournament and 2021 Africa U-20 Cup of Nations.

References

External links 

 

Living people
2004 births
Association football defenders
Ghanaian footballers
International Allies F.C. players
Ghana Premier League players
Ghana youth international footballers
Ghana under-20 international footballers
MŠK Žilina Africa players